Left Behind is a 2014 American apocalyptic thriller film directed by Vic Armstrong and written by Paul LaLonde and John Patus. Based on the 1995 novel of the same name written by Tim LaHaye and Jerry B. Jenkins, the film stars Nicolas Cage, Chad Michael Murray, Cassi Thomson, Nicky Whelan, Jordin Sparks, and Lea Thompson. The second film adaptation of the first Left Behind novel but not following the book's chronology, it centers on a worldwide disaster, which is shown from the perspective of one family, a husband (airline pilot Rayford Steele) and wife facing marital difficulties, and their two children.

Left Behind was theatrically released on October 3, 2014, by Freestyle Releasing. It was panned by critics and holds a 0% rating on Rotten Tomatoes. The film grossed $27 million worldwide against its $16 million production budget. A sequel featuring a new cast, titled Left Behind: Rise of the Antichrist, was released in 2023, with Kevin Sorbo starring and directing, while LaLonde returned as producer.

Plot 
University of Central Arkansas student Chloe Steele has flown home from college to New York to surprise her father, pilot Rayford Steele, for his birthday party. However, her mother, Irene, informs her that her father cannot make it. While at the airport waiting for him, Chloe meets investigative reporter Cameron "Buck" Williams.

Rayford shows up on his way to a flight and apologizes to Chloe for missing his birthday party, insisting he was called in to pilot a flight to London at the last minute. He also assures Chloe that things are fine between himself and his wife, who recently had become a proselytising Christian, much to Chloe's annoyance. Chloe suspects things are not fine between her parents – she had seen him flirting with flight attendant Hattie Durham and notices he has removed his wedding ring. Her suspicions are soon confirmed when an airport worker hands Chloe a pair of tickets for a concert in London that Rayford had ordered, indicating his trip was planned in advance.

Chloe brushes off another of her mother's preachings and takes her brother to the mall. As she hugs him, he vanishes, into thin air, leaving his clothes behind. The same has happened to numerous others at the mall. Mayhem breaks loose as shoppers begin looting the stores. A driver-less car plows through the mall windows, and a small plane without a pilot crashes into the parking lot. Chloe sees television reports of children and some adults disappearing, as worldwide panic sets in.

On Rayford's flight, the same strange event has occurred – several people, including his co-pilot Chris Smith, Kimmy, one of the flight attendants, and all the children on board, have simply disappeared. The remaining passengers panic and demand answers. Rayford does his best to reassure the passengers he will pass on information once he has any. He has difficulty getting radio or satellite phone contact with anyone on the ground, until he is finally informed that people have disappeared everywhere and the world is in uproar. Soon a pilot-less jet approaches directly into their flight path, resulting in a midair collision, that damages Rayford's fuel line. He decides his only option is to return to New York and hope his fuel holds out.

On the ground, Chloe hears her father's mayday call on her cell phone and assumes his plane has crashed. She later finds her mother's jewelry left behind in the still-running shower, as she has also disappeared. Chloe makes her way to her mother's church, where family pastor Bruce Barnes explains that God has taken his believers to heaven and the rest have to face the end of days. The pastor explains he was not taken because he did not really believe what he had preached. Rayford comes to the same conclusion after finding evidence of religious belief in his copilot and stewardess' personal effects. He tells Hattie about his wife. She is upset as she did not know he was married, but Rayford convinces her to be brave and to help calm the passengers down until they can safely land.

Chloe climbs to the top of a bridge, intending to commit suicide, when she gets a call from Buck, who is in the cockpit with Rayford. Rayford explains to Chloe that all the New York-area airports are closed and the streets full, and he is low on fuel and has nowhere to land. Chloe finds an abandoned truck and uses it to clear away the equipment from a road under construction in order to create a makeshift runway. She uses her compass app and tells Rayford the coordinates of the landing site. Rayford is able to glide to a rough landing, saving the passengers, who leave the plane only to see the world aflame. Buck mentions that it looks like the end of the world, while Chloe informs him that it is just the beginning.

Cast 

 Nicolas Cage as Rayford Steele
 Chad Michael Murray as Cameron "Buck" Williams
 Cassi Thomson as Chloe Steele
 Nicky Whelan as Hattie Durham
 Jordin Sparks as Shasta Carvell
 Lea Thompson as Irene Steele
 Lance E. Nichols as Pastor Bruce Barnes
 William Ragsdale as Chris Smith
 Martin Klebba as Melvin Weir
 Quinton Aaron as Simon
 Judd Lormand as Jim
 Stephanie Honore as Kimmy
 Gary Grubbs as Dennis
 Georgina Rawlings as Venice Baxter
 Sam Velasquez as Stan Marsh
 Lolo Jones as Lori
 Han Soto as Edwin
 Major Dodson as Rayford "Raymie" Steele, Jr.
 Alec Rayme as Hassid

Production 
On August 7, 2008, Cloud Ten Pictures announced that it had entered into a settlement agreement resolving the two lawsuits against it and Namesake Entertainment, which co-produced the original trilogy. The suit was filed by Tim LaHaye. The settlement ended a legal dispute over the Left Behind film rights that began in 2000.

On October 1, 2010, Cloud Ten again reacquired rights to the film. Cloud Ten announced that they were rebooting the Left Behind film series. It was in the news that they planned on making the remake of the big-budgeted theatrically released film series based on the novel Left Behind.

On October 31, 2011, it was reported that Paul LaLonde and John Patus, who worked on World at War together, had written a screenplay for the reboot. On October 19, 2012, it was reported in The Hollywood Reporter that stunt artist Vic Armstrong was set to direct the reboot film with the budget around $15 million.

Casting 
On October 19, 2012, The Hollywood Reporter reported that Nicolas Cage was in talks to join the cast as a lead actor. He portrays the lead role of Rayford Steele in the film. In December 2012, it was reported that Chad Michael Murray was in talks to join the cast, to play the role of journalist Cameron "Buck" Williams. On January 3, 2013, Ashley Tisdale joined to play the role of Chloe Steele in the film. In March 2013, Tia Mowry was in talks to join the cast of the film; later she joined. It was announced on August 9 that Tisdale dropped out due to scheduling conflicts. At that time, it was also announced that Jordin Sparks had signed on to join the cast. Sparks' character is named Shasta. On August 13, Cassi Thomson joined the lead cast, replacing Tisdale as Chloe Steele. On August 19, 2013, Olympic bobsledder and hurdler Lolo Jones was announced as a cast member, portraying an airport gate attendant. On September 9, 2013, Lea Thompson was announced to portray Rayford Steele's wife, Irene.

The character Nicolae Carpathia, the critical antagonist in the book series and 2000 film, does not appear in the film.

Filming 
Principal photography began on August 9, 2013 in Baton Rouge, Louisiana.

Release 
The film was theatrically released on October 3, 2014 in the United States via Stoney Lake Entertainment.

Home media 
Left Behind was released via DVD and Blu-ray Disc on January 6, 2015.

Reception

Box office 
Left Behind played on 1,825 screens on its opening weekend, taking the number six position at the US box office with $6,300,147. The film gained 62 screens the following weekend, but posted a decline of 55% to end with $2,834,919. The third weekend saw the film dip to 923 screens and posted a 67.5% drop to $922,618. Its fourth weekend was the biggest drop yet for the movie at 71%, but rebounded in the later weeks. The final two weekends of the film's US theatrical release, however, posted a robust 265% increase before ending its run on December 11, 2014.

It also debuted in Singapore and Russia on the same day as its US run (October 3), with the former grossing $101,585 from 13 screens and the latter grossing $620,636 from 470 screens. The following week, the film opened in three additional countries: Lebanon ($63,585 opening week) on October 8, and Malaysia ($303,833 opening week) and Philippines ($259,303 opening week) on October 9, all having the highest debuts in the top three, with the countries of Lebanon and Philippines had the film ranked second place on their Box Office Chart. The film opened in two more countries the following week. The film ranked eighth place in Taiwan and came in second place in the United Arab Emirates with $336,544 from 47 screens.

Egypt and Brazil soon followed on October 22 and 23, taking in $24,951 and $633,096, respectively. Brazil was the first country to actually post a second-week increase (but only a scant +0.2% increase) and retained its fifth-place spot, making $634,150 (from 232 screens) for a total of $1,591,847. The film dropped 41% in its third week to end the weekend with $373,034 and a total of $2,221,533.

The movie debuted in South Africa on December 4, 2014, ranking 11th place with a total of $14,424.

The movie opened in Ecuador on April 17, 2015, debuting in 7th place with $15,055 from 11 screens. The movie dropped 6% the second week, earning $14,156 from 12 screens. However, its third week suffered a massive -88% decline, ending the weekend with $1,673 from 6 screens. The film has grossed $45,652.

The film was released in Italy on July 29, 2015, and took the no. 3 position with $309,832. In its second weekend, the film dropped two spots to number five with $164,047 (a decline of 47%). The third week saw a decline of only 18% but retained its fifth place spot to end the weekend with 134,186. The film fell out of the top 10 beginning in its fourth week, as it ended the week $23,627 (resulting in a steep 82% drop). The film dropped to number 14 in its fifth week with $15,326. The sixth week saw a drop to the 16th position, but saw a steady 32% increase to end the week with $21,026. The seventh and final week saw only a scant 3% fall to end the week with $20,414. Its seven-week cumulative total stands at $1,048,328.

As of March 4, 2016, the film closed and had grossed $14,019,924 in North America and $13,385,972 in other territories for a worldwide total of $27,405,896, plus $5.2 million with home video sales, against a production budget of $16 million.

Critical response 
The film was panned by critics. On review aggregator Rotten Tomatoes, the film has an approval rating of 0% based on 69 reviews, with an average rating of 2.17/10. On Metacritic, the film has a score of 12 out of 100, based on 25 critics, indicating "overwhelming dislike". Audiences polled by CinemaScore gave the film an average grade of "B−" on an A+ to F scale.

In a review for Entertainment Weekly, film critic Lindsey Bahr gave the film a grade of F, writing, "At best, Left Behind is shoddily made sensationalist propaganda—with atrocious acting—that barely registers as entertainment. At worst, it's profoundly moronic. Audiences, Christian or not, deserve better, and it's hard to imagine that the ham-fisted revelations in this schlock could serve any higher purpose."

Richard Roeper gave the film a grade of D−, stating that "the writing is horrible, the direction is clunky, the special effects are not special [and] the acting is so wooden you could make a basketball court out of it. Everything about this film feels forced and overwrought. With all due respect: Oh. My. God."

On her ½ star review of the film, Linda Barnard from the Toronto Star writes, "The tantalizing prospect that this could have been a camp set-up of the Snakes on a Plane or Sharknado ilk pops up as Left Behind starts to echo 1970s flight deck-driven disaster films—and the parodies that followed. No such luck. Armstrong appears humourlessly earnest about his task. Score one for Satan."

Christian film critics were critical of Left Behind. Paul Chambers from MovieChambers.com begins his scathing review with, "There are millions of Christians with average or above-average intelligence. I'd like to think that I'm one of them. So, what possessed the makers of Left Behind to produce such an ignorant piece of garbage that's easily one of the worst films of 2014, if not all-time?"

Evangelical Christian magazine Christianity Today criticized the film, saying, "Left Behind is not a Christian movie, whatever 'Christian Movie' could even possibly mean. In fact, most Christians within the world of the movie—whether the street-preacher lady at the airport or Rayford Steele's wife—are portrayed as insistent, crazy, delusional, or at the very least just really annoying. They want churches to book whole theaters and take their congregations, want it to be a Youth Group event, want magazines like this one to publish Discussion Questions at the end of their reviews—want the system to churn away, all the while netting them cash, without ever having to have cared a shred about actual Christian belief. They want to trick you into caring about the movie. Don't." They also stated that they "tried to give the film zero stars, but our tech system won't allow it."

The film was praised by Tim LaHaye and Jerry Jenkins, the original authors of the Left Behind series. Neither liked the 2000 version and LaHaye filed suit against it for breach of contract. After watching an early screening of the film, LaHaye said, "It is the best movie I have ever seen on the rapture", while Jenkins said, "I believe it does justice to the novel and will renew interest in the entire series." When asked if it was good, Jenkins said, "It's better than good."

Awards 
Left Behind was nominated for three Razzies at the 35th Golden Raspberry Awards, for Worst Picture, Worst Screenplay, and Worst Actor for Nicolas Cage. It lost in all three categories to Saving Christmas, starring Kirk Cameron, who coincidentally starred in the original Left Behind film franchise.

Sequels 

Vanished – Left Behind: Next Generation, a spin-off film based on the spin-off series Left Behind: The Kids released on September 28, 2016. The film was produced by Tim LaHaye's grandson, Randy LaHaye and was well received by the book author.

In November 2021, LaLonde announced the beginning of production on Left Behind: Rise of the Antichrist, with Kevin Sorbo directing and replacing Nicolas Cage as Rayford Steele along with other roles being recast entirely. The film is set six months after the events of the 2014 film. The film was released in theaters on January 26, 2023.

References

External links 
 
 
 

Left Behind series
2014 films
2014 thriller drama films
2010s disaster films
2014 fantasy films
American thriller drama films
American aviation films
American disaster films
American fantasy films
Apocalyptic films
Christian apocalyptic films
2010s English-language films
Films about aviation accidents or incidents
Films about evangelicalism
Films based on American novels
Films directed by Vic Armstrong
Films set on airplanes
Films shot in Louisiana
Reboot films
Films based on works by Tim LaHaye
Films based on works by Jerry B. Jenkins
2014 drama films
2010s American films